The Walker Law passed in 1920 was an early New York state law regulating boxing.  The law reestablished legal boxing in the state following the three-year ban created by the repeal of the Frawley Law.  The law instituted rules that better ensured the safety of combatants and reduced the roughness of the sport.  The law limited matches to fifteen rounds, required a physician in attendance, restricted certain aggressive acts such as head-butting, and created a regulatory commission, the New York State Athletic Commission.

The first main event conducted under this new law was the Joe Welling vs. Johnny Dundee bout.

References

External links
"Boxing Law, Rules, and Regulations" - A timeline

Boxing rules and regulations
Sports law
Boxing in New York (state)
New York (state) statutes
1920 in American law
1920 in New York (state)